AD 52 (LII) was a leap year starting on Saturday (link will display the full calendar) of the Julian calendar. At the time, it was known as the Year of the Consulship of Sulla and Otho (or, less frequently, year 805 Ab urbe condita). The denomination AD 52 for this year has been used since the early medieval period, when the Anno Domini calendar era became the prevalent method in Europe for naming years.

Events

By place

Roman Empire 
 Emperor Claudius attempts to control the Fucine Lake by digging a 5.6 km tunnel through Monte Salviano, requiring 30,000 workers and eleven years.
 In Rome a law prohibits the execution of old and crippled slaves. 
 Ananias, a high priest in Jerusalem, is sent to Rome after being accused of violence.
 Barea Soranus is consul suffectus in Rome.
 Pliny the Elder writes his account of the German wars. 
 Tiridates I, brother of Vologases I, comes to power in Armenia as an adversary of the Romans.
 In Britain, governor Publius Ostorius Scapula dies while campaigning against the Silures of south Wales. Following his death, the Roman Second Legion are heavily defeated by the Silures. His replacement is Aulus Didius Gallus, who quells the rebellion and consolidates the gains the Romans have so far made, but does not seek new ones.

China 
 The Yuejue Shu, the first known gazetteer of China, is written during the Han Dynasty.

By topic

Religion 
 Saint Thomas, one of the twelve disciples of Jesus, is believed to have landed in Kodungallur, India to preach the Gospel; the Marthoma Church, the Syro-Malabar Catholic Church, the Malankara Mar Thoma Syrian Church, the Indian Orthodox Church, and the Assyrian Church of the East claim descent from him.

Deaths 
 Gamaliel, Jewish leader (nasi) (approximate date)
 Guo Shengtong, Chinese empress of the Han Dynasty
 Julia Iotapa, queen of Commagene (approximate date)
 Publius Ostorius Scapula, Roman statesman and general

References 

0052